Andrebakely Nord is a town and commune in Madagascar. It belongs to the district of Ambatondrazaka, which is a part of Alaotra-Mangoro Region. The population of the commune is 17,078 inhabitants by 2018.

Andrebakely Nord lies on the RN 44, between Imerimandroso (south) and Amboavory (north).

References and notes 

Populated places in Alaotra-Mangoro